A statue of  is installed near the Corona Market, in Centro, Guadalajara, in the Mexican state of Jalisco. The sculptor was Juan José Méndez Hernández. In April 2017, the machete he was holding was stolen.

References

External links

 

Centro, Guadalajara
Monuments and memorials in Jalisco
Outdoor sculptures in Guadalajara
Sculptures of men in Mexico
Statues in Jalisco
Vandalized works of art in Mexico